Carabinieri (singular form: carabiniere) is the name given to the gendarmerie-style police forces of some countries. It may refer specifically to:
Arma dei Carabinieri, the gendarmerie of Italy
Carabinieri (TV series), a 2000s Italian TV series
Trupele de Carabinieri, the gendarmerie of Moldova

See also
 for other similarly-named police forces
Italian ship Carabiniere, a list of ships with the name